Wayward is a comic book series written by Jim Zub, drawn by Steven Cummings, colored by Tamra Bonvillain, with flats by Ludwig Olimba, and letters by Marshall Dillon. Its publication, by Image Comics, began in 2014 and ended in 2018.

Publication history
Image Comics announced that Wayward would be released in August 2014. Often pitched as the modern Buffy the Vampire Slayer, Wayward was initially successful enough to warrant a reprint of both the first and second issues. Issue 30 has been confirmed to be the final issue.

Plot
Rori Lane, a young woman, moves to Tokyo from Ireland where she starts school and tries to establish herself and re-connect with her mother.  She is quickly caught up in supernatural events, forming alliances and trying to defend herself and her loved ones from mythical monsters.

Characters
AyaneA "cat girl" formed from the spirit energy of a group of stray Japanese cats.

Inaba Kami A kitsune ronin warrior who prefers to stay in her human form.

Nikaido Kazuaki A homeless teen boy who absorbs emotional energy and can release it in waves of calm or destruction.

Ohara Emi A teen girl who can control and manipulate man made objects/materials.

Rori Lane The protagonist of Wayward. A half Japanese, half Irish teenager with the power to see and manipulate 'threads' of power and destiny.

Segawa Touru A teen boy hacker who can control electronic networks and machines with his mind.

Shirai Tomohiro A teen boy who eats spirits to survive and augment his abilities.

Reception
Wayward was overall a well-reviewed title with an average rating of 8.7/10 from 215 critic reviews over its 30-issue span.

In other media
The American board game company IDW Games announced on May 18, 2017, that they were collaborating with Wayward author Jim Zub on a board game modeled after the comic book. The game is to be fully cooperative, with players assuming the roles of the comic's heroes fighting to defeat villains controlled by the game. Jon Gilmour was announced as designer for the Wayward board game.

It has also been announced that rights have been acquired by United Kingdom company Manga Entertainment in order to develop a Japanese animated or live action series.

Collected editions

References

External links
 Wayward at Image Comics
 Wayward at Comic Vine
 Comic Book DB

Comics by Jim Zub
Image Comics titles
2014 comics debuts
Comics publications
Yōkai in popular culture
Fantasy comics